Sultan Tokatayuly Abildayev (born 21 March 1970) is a Kazakh football manager and a former midfielder.

Club career
Abildayev spent most of his career with FC Irtysh Pavlodar and FC Kaisar in the Kazakhstan Premier League.

International career
Abildayev made three appearances for the Kazakhstan national football team in 1992.

References

External links

1970 births
Living people
Kazakhstani footballers
Association football midfielders
Kazakhstan international footballers
FC Kairat players
FC Kaisar players
FC Atyrau players
FC Irtysh Pavlodar players
Kazakhstan Premier League players
Kazakhstani football managers
FC Kaisar Kyzylorda managers